The triathlon competition at the 2022 Pacific Mini Games will be held on June 20 and 22, at the West Marine Harbor, and Round House in Rota, Northern Mariana Islands.

Competition schedule

Participating nations
As of 1 June 2022, seven countries and territories have confirmed their participation for triathlon at the games.

Medal summary

Medal table

Medalists

References

2022 Pacific Mini Games
2022 in triathlon
Triathlon at the Pacific Games